The 4.25 mm Liliput pistol is one of the smallest semiautomatic handguns ever made (the Kolibri is generally considered the smallest). Hence its name, derived from the fictional island of Lilliput, inhabited by tiny people.

The Liliput was manufactured by Waffenfabrik August Menz in Suhl, Germany, from approximately 1920 to 1927. Menz also manufactured a similar .25 ACP pistol introduced in 1925 as the Model 1, and a .32 ACP pistol sold as the Beholla Pistol. Overall length of the Liliput was 4.25 inches and barrel length was 1 inches.

Because the pistol uses a 4.25 mm (.167 in) cartridge (which became known as the 4.25mm Liliput and which is considered obsolete), the Liliput is one of the few pistols that can be owned in the United Kingdom without a license.

The Liliput features in a number of novels by Alistair MacLean, though he incorrectly calls it the "Luger Liliput" and refers to its calibre as ".21".

According to an Allied report, a Liliput pistol was issued to members of the Werwolf resistance force.

See also
 List of cartridges by caliber

References

External links
Pictures of the 4.5 mm Liliput cartridge, compared to the Kolibri rounds.
Pictures of Hitler's golden Liliput.
Menz Liliput 4.25mm
Forgotten Weapons: Menz Liliput Pocket Pistols: 4.25mm and 6.35mm

Semi-automatic pistols of Germany
.25 ACP semi-automatic pistols
.32 ACP semi-automatic pistols